In baking, a crust is the outer, hard skin of bread or the shell of a pie. Generally, it is made up of at least shortening or another fat, water, flour, and salt.  It may also include milk, sugar, or other ingredients that contribute to the taste or texture.  An egg or milk wash can be used to decorate the outside, as well as coarse sugar.  A crust contributes to a pastry. 

The ratio of ingredients and mixing method determines the texture of the crust. If the flour is not well mixed with the shortening, then water can bind to the available flour causing the gluten protein matrix to become over developed. This would result in a tough crust, as opposed to a flaky crust, which is more desirable. 

Depending on the type of pastry, the crust can be baked before it is filled, or in baked (baked together with the filling).  In pies, two different types of crust exist: one-crust pie and two-crust pie.  A two-crust pie can have either a complete upper crust, a lattice top, or any of a variety of other decorative tops.

See also 

 Graham cracker crust – a pie crust made from crushed crackers

References

Pies